Camden County Jail is a historic county jail located at Camden, Camden County, North Carolina. It was built in 1910, and is a two-story, nearly square brick building with a high hipped roof in the Colonial Revival style. On the second floor is the iron cellblock or "bullpen," likened to that of a large metal box.

The historic jail is now home to the Camden County Board of Elections and Camden County's Museum. It is open to the public during regular office hours.

It was listed on the National Register of Historic Places in 1984.

References

External links
 Camden County History Historic Jailhouse UNC-TV Feature Spotlight - Camden County
 Camden County Jail - Our State article

Jails on the National Register of Historic Places in North Carolina
Colonial Revival architecture in North Carolina
Government buildings completed in 1910
Buildings and structures in Camden County, North Carolina
National Register of Historic Places in Camden County, North Carolina
Jails in North Carolina
Museums in Camden County, North Carolina
Prison museums in the United States